Sport TV is a Hungarian sports television channel, associated with AMC Networks. It broadcasts the PDC darts tournament

References

Television networks in Hungary
Sports television in Hungary